Brazilian heraldry as a distinct form of heraldry dates to 1822, when Brazil became independent as an Empire, under the reign of the House of Braganza. Being formerly a part of the Portuguese Empire and being ruled by the same Royal House that reigned in Portugal, Brazilian heraldry followed the tradition of Portuguese heraldry.

Heraldry of the nobility
The Brazilian nobility included Brazilians that were members of Portuguese noble lineages and Brazilian citizens ennobled during the period of the Brazilian Monarchy (1822-1889). In most cases, the concession of new arms was associated with the concession of titles. As most Brazilian armigers had Portuguese ancestors and surnames, their arms were usually taken from the arms of the corresponding Portuguese lineages.

The system of heraldry of the Brazilian non-royal nobility applies those lineages that were not part of the Imperial Family, and includes specific coronets of rank.

Civic heraldry
Civic heraldry refers to the coat of arms borne by the government of Brazil, by its states and by its municipalities.

There are no official standards regulating civic heraldry in Brazil. However, the general standards that govern modern Portuguese municipal heraldry - established in 1930 - have been followed in most of the modern coat of arms created for Brazilian municipalities. Some older municipal coat of arms were also corrected to conform with those standards. In general, Brazilian municipal coats of arms are displayed in a round bottom shield (Portuguese shield) and are topped by a mural crown, with a scroll under the shield usually including the name of the municipality. As all Brazilian seats of municipalities have the status of "city" (in comparison with Portugal, where most still have only the status of "town"), only mural crowns with five apparent towers are generally used. Golden mural crowns are attributed to state capitals, while silver crowns are attributed to other cities. Restrictions that apply to Portuguese municipal coat of arms regarding the inclusion of the Arms of Portugal and the division of the field in several partitions are generally ignored in Brazil. Also, many Brazilian municipal coats of arms include a motto in the scroll under the shield, which is rare in Portugal (although allowed). Besides this, a number of Brazilian municipal coats of arms include supporters, whose application is not foreseen in the Portuguese municipal heraldry standards.

The majority of the coats of arms of Brazilian states were adopted in the late 19th century and do not follow heraldic standards. The same applies to modern coat of arms of Brazil, adopted after the implementation of the republic in 1889.

Royal heraldry
Royal heraldry refers to the coats of arms of the members of the Brazilian imperial family, including the Monarchs, the consorts and princes.

Brazilian coats of arms

National

Brazilian Imperial Family

Brazilian nobility

Brazilian states

Brazilian municipalities

Armed forces

Universities

See also
 Coat of arms of Brazil
 Portuguese heraldry
 Brazilian nobility

Heraldry by country
Portuguese heraldry